The 14th Filmfare Awards South Ceremony honoring the winners of the best of South Indian cinema in 1966 was an event held in 1967.The Malayalam films are added in this year.

Awards

Special Awards

References

 Filmfare Magazine 1967.

General

External links
 
 

Filmfare Awards South